The St George's Church is a Georgian Orthodox Church located in the village of Gakh-Inguila in the Qakh district, 30 metres away from the left bank of the Kakistskali river, northwestern Azerbaijan, on the border with Georgia, where the Ingiloy Georgians live compactly (about 7,500 people). The church was destroyed as a result of Shah Abbas I's invasions of Georgia, but later was reconstructed on the site of an old church in the first half of the 18th century. Its latest renovation by Ivan-Baba Belughashvili dates form the late 19th century. Currently, church is the only active Georgian Orthodox church in Azerbaijan.

See also
Kurmukhi Church
Church of Kish

References

Eastern Orthodox churches in Azerbaijan